The Grand Glaize Bridge is the name of two girder bridges that carry U.S. Route 54 over the Grand Glaize Arm of the Lake of the Ozarks in the city of Osage Beach, Missouri.

The bridge on official maps is called the "Grandglaize" (one word) as is the body of water it crosses to differentiate it from an entirely different Grand Glaize Creek that is a tributary to the Meramec River in St. Louis County, Missouri. However, in widespread usage, it is referred to as so in two words.

The original two-lane Grand Glaize Bridge was built in 1931 during the construction of Bagnell Dam and the Lake of the Ozarks. It was a Warren truss or deck truss structure with the trusses built under the deck so traffic could see the lake. Its unusual design prompted it to be called the "upside down bridge". Other bridges built across the lake at the time including the Hurricane Deck Bridge over the Osage Arm and the Niangua Bridge over the Niangua Arm were also deck truss structures. The only non-deck-truss bridge on the lake was the Niangua Arm US 54 Bridge. The bridge was known for its very narrow lanes and no shoulder.

The new parallel girder bridge carrying westbound traffic was completed in 1984. A new eastbound girder bridge was built in 1995 and the original bridge was torn down. The Niangua Bridge has also been torn down leaving the Hurricane Deck Bridge as the only remaining deck truss bridge until 2013 when it too was demolished.

See also
List of bridges documented by the Historic American Engineering Record in Missouri

References
 Bridgehunter profile

External links

Bridges completed in 1931
Bridges completed in 1984
Lake of the Ozarks
Buildings and structures in Camden County, Missouri
Road bridges in Missouri
U.S. Route 54
Bridges of the United States Numbered Highway System
Girder bridges in the United States
Historic American Engineering Record in Missouri